Júlio César Clemente Pereira Baptista (born 1 October 1981) is a Brazilian football manager and former player who played as an attacking midfielder or a forward. He is the current manager of Valladolid B.

Baptista is nicknamed "The Beast" due to his size and physical presence on the football field and "Hulio" due to an interview with former teammate Joaquín. He began his career as a defensive midfielder, and after a series of impressive performances for his hometown squad São Paulo FC, Baptista signed for Sevilla FC in 2003. Upon signing for Sevilla, he was converted into a forward, and in his two seasons, he scored 50 goals, leading to his 2005 transfer to Spanish giants Real Madrid. After two unsuccessful seasons at Real Madrid with a loan spell at Arsenal sandwiched in between, Baptista transferred to Roma in Italy. In January 2011 he returned to Spain by signing for Málaga, and two years later went back to Brazil with Cruzeiro.

Club career

São Paulo

Sevilla
On 3 August 2003, Sevilla FC unveiled Baptista as their newest signing. He cost the Spanish club £1.75 million (US$3.75 million). Baptista made it clear he was confident that he would succeed in Spain. He donned the No.19 jersey and began playing as an attacking midfielder. Baptista settled in quickly, scoring a double in Sevilla's 4–0 victory over Racing de Santander. As the season progressed, his good form continued, including a double against Levante UD and once more hitting the back of the net against Racing de Santander, this time with four goals as Sevilla picked up a 5–2 victory at home.

His form attracted the attention of several big clubs, but despite interest from English giants Arsenal, Baptista remained at Sevilla for the following season, in which he once more showed his worth registering 25 goals in all competitions.

Between 2003 and 2005, Baptista made 81 appearances in all competitions for Sevilla and scored 50 goals in total. With this goal tally came a summer of transfer rumours in which Real Madrid battled it out with Arsenal for his signature.

Real Madrid
On 25 July 2005, Real Madrid confirmed the signing of the long-time Arsenal target for a fee of £13.8 million (€20 million), rising to £16.9 million (€24.5 million); Baptista signed a five-year deal. Baptista said he had chosen to remain in Spain at least one more year, as transferring to Real Madrid would allow him to gain dual citizenship (in Spain as well as Brazil), which would enable him to travel across Europe freely. He also explained he did not want to move to England at this time. Upon his arrival at Real Madrid, Baptista was awarded the No.8 jersey.

The season looked very promising for Real Madrid; the big-money signings of Robinho from Santos FC, Baptista, and Sergio Ramos from Sevilla meant that Real Madrid were tipped to end their trophy drought. It was not to be, however. At Real, Baptista was often played out of position as a left-winger to accommodate the likes of Zinedine Zidane and Guti in the Spanish side's attacking line-up. For this reason, he was unable to find the form that led many of Europe's top clubs to want to sign him. He managed to score just eight league goals throughout the 2006 league campaign. The season ended in disappointment as Real Madrid yet again ended the season without a trophy.

Baptista insisted that Arsenal were still in pursuit of him, but he made it clear he wanted to fulfill his contract with Real Madrid.

At the end of August 2006, with the transfer window about to close, press reports linked him with a move to either Tottenham Hotspur or Arsenal. The latter was part of a possible swap deal that included José Antonio Reyes. Baptista went on to strenuously claim that he was not interested in a move away from Real Madrid. However, on 31 August 2006, the day of the transfer deadline, Baptista moved to Arsenal in exchange for Reyes. The deal saw both players signing on to 12-month loans at their new clubs. He scored his first goal for Arsenal against Hamburg in the Champions League on 21 November 2006.

Baptista struggled to score in the Premier League, managing just three goals in 24 league matches. Baptista, however, found scoring form in the League Cup, with six goals in the competition, including a club record four goals in Arsenal's quarter-final victory against Liverpool on 9 January 2007, in a 6–3 win for Arsenal; beside his 4 goals, he also missed a penalty kick in that game, and missed two other penalties that season against Bolton Wanderers and Portsmouth. Baptista also scored twice in Arsenal's semi-final against Tottenham Hotspur (having also scored an own goal at the other end), but they lost 2–1 to Chelsea in the final.

In total, Baptista scored 10 goals in 35 appearances for Arsenal.

At the end of the 2006–07 season, he was no longer required by Arsenal and returned to Real Madrid, as the loan deal finished. After the appointment of Bernd Schuster as head coach of Madrid, Baptista played far more often and in his preferred central position.

Baptista went on to score first in a 3–0 victory that knocked Lazio out of the Champions League. He then netted a magnificent first half goal from a one-two pass from Ruud van Nistelrooy against rivals Barcelona in the El Clásico. Baptista's goal proved to be vital in a game that eventually finished 1–0 to the visitors. This was only the second time Real Madrid had beaten rivals Barcelona in the league at the Camp Nou in 24 years.

During the season, Baptista continued his good form. This led to many praising his good performances as he continued to keep Guti on the bench. Real eventually won that season's La Liga title with Baptista thus earning a winner's medal.

Roma
Roma ended their search for another forward on 14 August, when they signed Baptista from Real Madrid. The Serie A club said in a statement that the 26-year-old had cost an initial €9 million plus bonuses and had penned a four-year deal worth €4.5million before tax and excluding bonuses.

Baptista made his debut for Roma in the Supercoppa Italiana on 24 August 2008, but the team lost to Inter Milan on penalties. Baptista converted his penalty kick. On 1 October 2008, he scored his first Champions League goals for the club, scoring a double against Bordeaux to give his side a 3–1 victory. Baptista scored Roma's winning goal in his first Rome derby against Lazio.

In the Champions League, Roma drew Baptista's former club, Arsenal. He played in both games, the first at the Emirates Stadium, a ground he used to call home, and the return leg at the Stadio Olimpico. In the return leg, Baptista came on as an early substitute, following the early injury to Roma's goalscorer Juan. Baptista had a couple of chances to give Roma the two goal advantage that would have sent them through to the quarter-final stage of the Champions League, most notably a chance in the 79th minute, where he missed from 10 yards out with just Manuel Almunia to beat. Roma lost 7–6 in the ensuing penalty shootout.

Málaga
On 3 January 2011, Málaga CF announced the signing of Júlio Baptista. He signed a two-and-a-half-year contract. On 14 January 2011, Roma announced that the transfer fee was €2.5 million. He made his debut for Málaga on 16 January 2011 in a 4–1 defeat at Barcelona, and six days later he scored his first goal in a 4–3 defeat at Valencia CF.

Baptista, however, was injured during the match between Málaga and Getafe CF (and scoring from penalty in a 2–2 draw) and was operated in Brazil couple of days later. He returned to action on 16 April 2011 by scoring twice in a 3–0 home win over RCD Mallorca, taking the team out of the relegation zone.

On 1 October 2011, Baptista scored a dramatic late winner in a 3–2 win over Getafe with an overhead kick, on his 30th birthday. However, he injured his right leg during the match, and though it was at first thought to be a minor injury he ultimately needed an operation that would keep him out of action for the rest of the year. On 6 March 2012 it was announced that Baptista might miss the rest of the season and would travel to Brazil to recover from his injury. He made his comeback on 3 February 2013, coming on as a substitute in a 1–1 draw against Real Zaragoza.  Baptista scored his first goal since his return from injury on 30 March, netting the winner in Malaga's 3–1 defeat of Rayo Vallecano, a result that pushed the side into fourth place in La Liga.

On 24 July 2013, Málaga CF terminated his contract with the La Liga club.

Cruzeiro
On 24 July 2013, Júlio Baptista signed with the Brazilian first division club Cruzeiro Esporte Clube, where he was teamed up with well-known names such as Dedé, Dagoberto, and Fábio. He was reported to be on a two-year contract, with a reportedly €170,000 per month salary.

On 28 July 2013, Baptista went to the Mineirão Stadium in an armored car, and was presented to Celeste fans in the club's 4–1 victory against rivals Atlético Mineiro. After his presentation, Baptista did not confirm when he could debut for his new club. According to La Bestia, it depended on "documentation and of Marcelo Oliveira (Cruzeiro's coach)".

Manager Marcelo Oliveira praised Baptista for working to return to his best shape. Asked in which position Oliveira would play Baptista, he affirmed that Baptista would play as a playmaker, because he played in this position for Sevilla, in his best days. Oliveira also said he wanted Ricardo Goulart instead of Baptista to mark players.

Orlando City
On 23 March 2016, Orlando City SC announced that they had signed Baptista. He made his Major League Soccer debut on 8 April as a sub against Philadelphia Union, and scored his first goal in the league on 29 May against New York City FC. His contract option was declined by the club on 23 November 2016, making him a free agent.

CFR Cluj
On 18 August 2018, Baptista penned a deal for an undisclosed period with Romanian defending champions CFR Cluj. Eight days later, he made his debut in a goalless Liga I draw at Gaz Metan Mediaș, replacing Alexandru Ioniță in the 70th minute. 

Baptista became subject of controversy in Romania, having played only 43 minutes for CFR in 2018, which made him one of the best paid football players per minute played.

He announced his retirement on 23 May 2019.

International career
Baptista has 47 caps with Brazil and has netted five goals. His first cap came on 4 June 2001 in the 2001 FIFA Confederations Cup, a 0–0 draw against Japan. He also played a limited part in the 2005 edition of the competition.

As Baptista often played out of position at Real Madrid, his form dipped, and he was not included on the 2006 World Cup roster. However, Baptista was re-called to the Brazil squad for the 2007 Copa América and scored the opening goal in Brazil's 3–0 victory over Argentina in the final on 15 July 2007. Baptista ended the competition with three goals. He went on to play the 2010 World Cup for Brazil under coach Dunga.

Coaching career
On 27 June 2019, Baptista was named manager of the Juvenil squad of Real Valladolid, owned by former Real Madrid teammate Ronaldo. On 8 July 2021, he took over the club's reserve team after Javier Baraja left.

Career statistics

Club

International
Updated 2 July 2010.

International goals
''Scores and results table. Brazil's goal tally first:

Honours
São Paulo
Campeonato Paulista: 2000
Torneio Rio – São Paulo: 2001

Arsenal
League Cup: Runner-up 2006–07

Real Madrid
La Liga: 2007–08

Cruzeiro
Campeonato Brasileiro Série A: 2013, 2014
Campeonato Mineiro: 2014

CFR Cluj
Liga I: 2018–19

Brazil Youth
South American U-20 Championship: 2001

Brazil
Copa América: 2004, 2007
FIFA Confederations Cup: 2005, 2009
Individual
La Liga Breakthrough Player of the Year: 2004

References

External links

 Málaga official profile 
 La Liga profile 
 
 
 
 
 2010 FIFA World Cup profile
 

1981 births
Living people
Footballers from São Paulo
Naturalised citizens of Spain
Brazilian footballers
Association football forwards
Association football midfielders
Association football utility players
Campeonato Brasileiro Série A players
São Paulo FC players
Cruzeiro Esporte Clube players
La Liga players
Real Madrid CF players
Sevilla FC players
Málaga CF players
Premier League players
Arsenal F.C. players
Serie A players
A.S. Roma players
Major League Soccer players
Orlando City SC players
Liga I players
CFR Cluj players
Brazil under-20 international footballers
Brazil international footballers
2001 FIFA Confederations Cup players
2003 CONCACAF Gold Cup players
2004 Copa América players
2005 FIFA Confederations Cup players
2007 Copa América players
2009 FIFA Confederations Cup players
2010 FIFA World Cup players
Copa América-winning players
FIFA Confederations Cup-winning players
Brazilian expatriate footballers
Expatriate footballers in Spain
Brazilian expatriate sportspeople in Spain
Expatriate footballers in England
Brazilian expatriate sportspeople in England
Expatriate footballers in Italy
Brazilian expatriate sportspeople in Italy
Expatriate soccer players in the United States
Brazilian expatriate sportspeople in the United States
Expatriate footballers in Romania
Brazilian expatriate sportspeople in Romania
Brazilian football managers
Primera Federación managers